Packwood Haugh School is a co-educational private Preparatory school for pupils from the ages of 4 to 13, offering places for both day and boarding pupils. It is located in Ruyton-XI-Towns, midway between Oswestry and Shrewsbury in Shropshire, England. Fees are around £6 000 a term.

History
In 1956, it became a charitable trust. Girls joined the school in 1968 and a separate boarding house, Park House, provides boarding accommodation for girls. A pre-preparatory department, Packwood Acorns, was established in 1993 for day children only aged between four and seven and is also located within Park House.
The rural site of 66 acres includes many facilities, such as a floodlit all-weather surface, a sports hall, purpose-built design and technology (DT) and art studios, an indoor swimming pool, science laboratories and a modern theatre.

The Happy Faces day care nursery opened in September 2013 for young children under school age.

Curriculum
Through participation in a broad curriculum, centred on core literacy and numeracy skills that underpin all other subjects, pupils develop a good level of knowledge and understanding. Nearly all pupils stay at the school until they are 13, successfully gaining places in the senior schools of their choice, with a significant number gaining scholarships and awards.

In addition to English and Maths, the curriculum includes:

As they progress through the school pupils may participate in national competitions including UK Mathematics Trust challenges, the Townsend Warner History Prize and the Satips general knowledge competition.

The well-planned curriculum across the school is supported by an excellent programme of extra-curricular activities which enriches the pupils’ learning experiences. There is an extensive choice of clubs, such as pottery, cooking and debating, and external specialists offer additional opportunities such as judo and scuba diving.

Sport
There is a big games playing tradition at Packwood and a wide range of sports is available, with girls’ cricket, fencing, swimming, squash and riding enriching the core provision of football, rugby, hockey, netball cricket and lacrosse. 
Many pupils participate in local and national sporting competitions, with some achieving outstanding success in their chosen sport. Recent achievements have included top national rankings for boys and girls in under 11 and under 13 fencing competitions. Girls’ and boys’ cricket teams have both enjoyed strong results in local and regional matches, with many pupils selected for county squads and the girls’ team reaching the indoor cricket national finals.

Notable Old Packwoodians
 Rt Revd Mark Rylands – Bishop of Shrewsbury
 Tom James – double Olympic gold medal winning rower
 Fergus Macleod – Charles Mackerras Fellow at English National Opera
 Rhys Bevan – actor
 Alan Napier - actor
 Christopher Gordon Horsfall Simon - British General Commissioner of Income Tax.
 Jonathan Wright - British journalist and literary translator.
 Sir Frederick Wolff Ogilvie - Director-General of the BBC
 Nicholas Budgen - Conservative Party politician
 Dan Goyder - Eminent lawyer
 Arthur Lewis Jenkins - Soldier, pilot and war poet.

References

External links 
School Website
Profile on the ISC website
Profile on the Good Schools Guide
Profile in Tatler Good Schools Guide
Attain Magazine
Happy Faces Nursery at Packwood Haugh
Old Packwoodian Facebook Page

Boarding schools in Shropshire
Educational institutions established in 1892
Preparatory schools in Shropshire
1892 establishments in England